Ira Smith may refer to:

Ira Smith (baseball) (born 1967), American baseball player
Ira Smith (announcer), American public address announcer
Ira E. Smith (1864-1948), Wisconsin state politician
Ira Harvey Smith (1815-1883), Kansas state politician
Ira P. Smith (1832-1904), Wisconsin State politician